Actaea matsumurae, the Kamchatka bugbane or Japanese bugbane, is a species of flowering plant in the buttercup family Ranunculaceae, that is native to Japan, Mongolia and Eastern Russia. Other common names include baneberry, which is also applied to other Actaea species.

This rhizomatous herbaceous perennial was formerly known as Cimicifuga matsumurae, a name which is still found in the horticultural literature.

Description
The leaves are compound and deeply-cut in shape, with showy, miniature white flowers borne on erect stems in late summer or autumn. It is the latest flowering of the cultivated Actaea species.  The racemes of flowers may bend towards the light. They may be followed by poisonous black berries.

Cultivation
The plant is best grown in a partly-shaded, sheltered spot, in soil that remains reliably moist.

Two cultivars, 'Elstead Variety' and 'White Pearl' have achieved the Royal Horticultural Society's Award of Garden Merit.

References

matsumurae
Flora of Japan
Flora of Russia
Flora of Mongolia